Mortimer J. "Tim" Buckley (born 1969) is an American executive at The Vanguard Group. The Vanguard Board elected him unanimously to succeed F. William McNabb III as chief executive officer upon McNabb's retirement at the end of December 2017.

Early life and education 
Buckley was born in 1969, the son of Dr. Mortimer John Buckley and his wife Marilyn (née Scully) Buckley. His father was the Chief of the Massachusetts General Hospital Cardiac Surgical Unit in Boston.

Buckley attended secondary school at the Belmont Hill School in Belmont, MA. He later earned a BA degree in economics in 1991 from Harvard College and an MBA degree in 1996 from Harvard Business School.

Career 
In 1991 Buckley joined Vanguard as an assistant to company founder John C. Bogle. From 2001 to 2006 Buckley was Chief Information Officer, and from 2006 to 2012 he was head of the Retail Investor Group. He became Chief Investment Officer upon the retirement of Gus Sauter in 2013.

In 2017, Vanguard's Board of Directors unanimously elected Buckley to succeed F. William McNabb III as chief executive officer, effective January 2018.

References 

1969 births
American corporate directors
Harvard Business School alumni
Living people
American chief executives of financial services companies
Harvard College alumni
Chief investment officers
The Vanguard Group